Bithoor Assembly constituency is one of 403 legislative assembly seats of Uttar Pradesh. It is part of the Akbarpur Lok Sabha constituency.

Overview
Bithoor comprises KC 4-Bhitargaon of 3-Ghatampur Tehsil; KCs 1-Pali, 4-Bidhnu, 5- Sachendi, 6-Bithoor and Bithoor Nagar Palika of 2-Kanpur Sadar Tehsil.

Members of Legislative Assembly

Election results

2022

2017

2012

See also
 List of Vidhan Sabha constituencies of Uttar Pradesh

References

External links
 

Politics of Kanpur
Assembly constituencies of Uttar Pradesh